Margaret Watson (born 18 December 1986) is an Australian rugby union player. 

Watson was a member of the Australian squad in the 2010 Women's Rugby World Cup that finished in third place. She was named to 's 2014 Women's Rugby World Cup squad.

References

External links
 Wallaroos Profile

1986 births
Living people
Australia women's international rugby union players
Australian female rugby union players
Australian female rugby sevens players
Rugby union hookers
20th-century Australian women
21st-century Australian women